Hurling is an outdoor team game of ancient Gaelic Irish origin, played by men. One of Ireland's native Gaelic games, it shares a number of features with Gaelic football, such as the field and goals, the number of players and much terminology. The same game played by women is called camogie, which shares a common Gaelic root.

The  can be caught in the hand and carried for not more than four steps, struck in the air or struck on the ground with the hurley. It can be kicked, or slapped with an open hand (the hand pass), for short-range passing.

Provided that a player has at least one foot on the ground, he may make a shoulder-to-shoulder charge on an opponent who is in possession of the ball or is playing the ball, or when both players are moving in the direction of the ball.

No protective padding is worn by players. A plastic protective helmet with a faceguard is mandatory for all age groups as of 2010. The game has been described as "a bastion of humility", with player names absent from jerseys and a player's number decided by his position on the field.

Hurling is administered by the Gaelic Athletic Association (GAA). It is played throughout the world and is a fixture of life In many parts of Ireland. Hurling has some popularity among members of the Irish diaspora in North America, Europe, Australia, New Zealand, South Africa, and Argentina. It has featured regularly in art forms such as film, music and literature. The final of the All-Ireland Senior Hurling Championship was listed in second place by CNN in its "10 sporting events you have to see live", after the Olympic Games and ahead of both the FIFA World Cup and UEFA European Championship. After covering the 1959 All-Ireland Senior Hurling Championship Final between Kilkenny and Waterford for BBC Television, English football commentator Kenneth Wolstenholme was moved to describe hurling as his second favourite sport in the world. Alex Ferguson used footage of an All-Ireland Senior Hurling Championship final in an attempt to motivate his players during his time as manager of Premier League football club Manchester United. The players winced at the standard of physicality and intensity in which the hurlers engaged. In 2007, Forbes magazine described the media attention and population multiplication of Thurles town ahead of one of the game's annual provincial hurling finals as being "the rough equivalent of 30 million Americans watching a regional lacrosse game". Financial Times columnist Simon Kuper wrote after Stephen Bennett's performance in the 2020 All-Ireland Senior Hurling Championship Final that hurling was "the best sport ever and if the Irish had colonised the world, nobody would ever have heard of football".

UNESCO lists hurling as an element of Intangible cultural heritage.

Statistics
 A team comprises 15 players, or "hurlers"
 The hurl is generally  in length
 The goalkeeper's hurl usually has a bas (the flattened, curved end) twice the size of other players' hurleys to provide some advantage against the fast moving sliotar
 A ball hit over the bar is worth one point. A ball that is hit under the bar is called a goal and is worth three points.
 As of 2010, all players must wear helmets.

Rules

Playing field

A hurling pitch is similar in some respects to a rugby pitch but larger. A net extending behind the goal is attached to the crossbar and lower goal posts. The same pitch is used for Gaelic football; the GAA, which organises both sports, decided this to facilitate dual usage. Lines are marked at distances of 14 yards, 21 yards and 65 yards (45 yards for Gaelic football) from each end-line. Shorter pitches and smaller goals are used by youth teams.

Teams

Teams consist of fifteen players: a goalkeeper, three full backs, three half backs, two midfielders, three half forwards and three full forwards (see diagram). The panel is made up of 24–30 players and five substitutions are allowed per game. An exception can now be made in the case of a blood substitute being necessary. Blood substitutes are a result of one player needing medical treatment for a laceration, usually stitches, and another coming on as a temporary replacement while the injured player is tended to.

Helmets

From 1 January 2010, the wearing of helmets with faceguards became compulsory for hurlers at all levels. This saw senior players follow the regulations already introduced in 2009 at minor and under 21 grades. The GAA hopes to significantly reduce the number of injuries by introducing the compulsory wearing of helmets with full faceguards, both in training and matches. Hurlers of all ages, including those at nursery clubs when holding a hurley in their hand, must wear a helmet and faceguard at all times. Match officials will be obliged to stop play if any player at any level appears on the field of play without the necessary standard of equipment.

Duration, extra time, replays
Senior inter-county matches last 70 minutes (35 minutes per half). All other matches last 60 minutes (30 minutes per half). For teams under-13 and lower, games may be shortened to 50 minutes. Timekeeping is at the discretion of the referee who adds on stoppage time at the end of each half. In 2020, water breaks were brought in after the first 15 minutes in each half.

There are various solutions for knockout games that end in a draw, such as a replay, or what the rules refer to as "Winner on the Day" measures such as extra time (20 minutes), further extra time (10 more minutes), or a shoot-out. The application and details of these measures vary according to the importance of the match and the difficulty of scheduling possible replays, and can change from year to year.  The general trend is that the GAA have been trying to reduce the need for replays, to ease scheduling.

Technical fouls
The following are considered technical fouls ("fouling the ball"):

 Picking the ball directly off the ground (instead it must be flicked up with the hurley)
 Throwing the ball (instead it must be "hand-passed": slapped with the open hand)
 Going more than four steps with the ball in the hand (it may be carried indefinitely on the hurley)
 Catching the ball three times in a row without it touching the ground (touching the hurley does not count)
 Putting the ball from one hand to the other
 Hand-passing a goal
 "Chopping" slashing downwards on another player's hurl
Deliberately dropping the Hurley or throwing it away.
A 'square ball', entering the opponent's small rectangle prior to the ball entering it
To cover or shield the ball by lying down on it.
To deliberately throw the ball up and catch it again (the ball must touch a hurl or other body part)
Carrying the ball over the opponent's goal line

Aggressive fouls 
Can be deliberate or accidental, oftentimes accompanied by a card. They are as follows:

 Pulling down an opponent.
 Using the hurl in an uncontrolled or reckless way.
 Tripping an opponent up
 Using threatening and/or abusive language to an opposing player, a teammate or an official
 Throwing the hurl in a dangerous manner
 Attempts to strike any player or official with a hurl, elbow, fist, head or kick
 Spitting at an opponent 
 Any form of racial, sectarian or homophobic abuse

Scoring

Scoring is achieved by sending the sliotar between the opposition's goal posts. The posts, which are at each end of the field, are H posts as in rugby football but with a net under the crossbar as in football. The posts are 6.4 m apart and the crossbar is 2.44 m above the ground.

If the ball goes over the crossbar, a point is scored and a white flag is raised by an umpire. If the ball goes below the crossbar, a goal, worth three points, is scored, and a green flag is raised by an umpire. A goal must be scored by either a striking motion or by directly soloing the ball into the net. The goal is guarded by a goalkeeper. Scores are recorded in the format {goal total} – {point total}. For example, the 1997 All-Ireland final finished: Clare 0–20 Tipperary 2–13. Thus Clare won by one point (2–13 being worth nineteen points).

In speech, a score consisting of at least one goal and one point is read as simply the two numbers, so Tipperary's 2–13 is read "two thirteen"; the words "goals" and "points" invariably omitted. Goals are never "converted" into points; it is incorrect to describe a score of 2–13 as "nineteen". 2–0 would be referred to as "two goals", never "two zero". Likewise, 0–10 would be referred to as "ten points", never "zero ten". 0–0 is said "no score". So the Clare/Tipperary match score would be read as "Clare twenty points, Tipperary two thirteen".

Tackling
Players may be tackled but not struck by a one-handed slash of the stick; exceptions are two-handed jabs and strikes. Jersey-pulling, wrestling, pushing and tripping are all forbidden. There are several forms of acceptable tackling, the most popular being:

 the "block", where one player attempts to smother an opposing player's strike by trapping the ball between his hurley and the opponent's swinging hurl
 the "hook", where a player approaches another player from a rear angle and attempts to catch the opponent's hurley with his own at the top of the swing
 the "side pull", where two players running together for the sliotar will collide at the shoulders and swing together to win the tackle and "pull" (name given to swing the hurley) with extreme force
The "shoulder barge" where one player attackes the other player by shoving them with their shoulder contacting the other players shoulder

Restarting play

 The match begins with the referee throwing the sliotar in between the four midfielders on the halfway line
 After an attacker has scored or put the ball wide of the goals, the goalkeeper may take a "puckout" from the hand at the edge of the small square. All players must be beyond the 20 m line.
 After a defender has put the ball wide of the goals, an attacker may take a "65" from the 65 m line level with where the ball went wide. It must be taken by lifting and striking. However, the ball must not be taken into the hand but struck whilst the ball is lifted.
 After a player has put the ball over the sideline, the other team may take a 'sideline cut' at the point where the ball left the pitch. It must be taken from the ground.
 After a player has committed a foul, the other team may take a 'free' at the point where the foul was committed. It must be taken by lifting and striking in the same style as the "65".
 After a defender has committed a foul inside the square (large rectangle), the other team may take a "penalty" from the ground from behind the 20 m line. Only the goalkeeper may guard the goals. It must be taken by lifting and striking and the sliotar must be struck on or behind the 20m line (The penalty rule was amended in 2015 due to safety concerns. Before this the ball merely had to start at the 20m line but could be struck beyond it. To balance this advantage the two additional defenders previously allowed on the line have been removed).
 If many players are struggling for the ball and no side is able to capitalize or gain control of it the referee may choose to throw the ball in between two opposing players. This is also known as a "throw in".

Officials
A hurling match is watched over by eight officials:

 The referee (on field)
 Two linesmen (sideline)
 Sideline official/standby linesman (inter-county games only)
 Four umpires (two at each end)
Hawkeye Video technology for some scoring situations in Croke Park and Semple Stadium (inter-county games only)
The referee is responsible for starting and stopping play, recording the score, awarding frees, noting infractions, and issuing yellow (caution) and red (order off) penalty cards to players after offences. A second yellow card at the same game leads to a red card, and therefore to a dismissal.

Linesmen are responsible for indicating the direction of line balls to the referee and also for conferring with the referee. The fourth official is responsible for overseeing substitutions, and also indicating the amount of stoppage time (signalled to him by the referee) and the players substituted using an electronic board. The umpires are responsible for judging the scoring. They indicate to the referee whether a shot was: wide (spread both arms), a 65 m puck (raise one arm), a point (wave white flag), or a goal (wave green flag).

Contrary to popular belief within the association, all officials are not obliged to indicate "any misdemeanours" to the referee, but are in fact permitted to inform the referee only of violent conduct they have witnessed which has occurred without the referee's knowledge. A linesman or umpire is not permitted to inform the referee of technical fouls such as a "third time in the hand", where a player catches the ball for a third time in succession after soloing or an illegal pick up of the ball. Such decisions can only be made at the discretion of the referee.

Injury risk 

Blunt injury to the larynx is an infrequent consequence of contact sports despite protective equipment and stringent rules. Hurling, one of the two national sporting games of Ireland, is seen as one of the fastest field sports on earth and only played with a facemask and helmet as protection, making injury an unavoidable feature of the game without further padding. The two most common sites of injury in hurling are the fingers and the hamstrings. Hurling is also considered to have, "...a notable proportion of blunt scrotal trauma."

History

Hurling is older than the recorded history of Ireland. It is thought to predate Christianity, having come to Ireland with the Celts. The earliest written references to the sport in Brehon law date from the 5th century. Seamus King's book A History of Hurling references oral history going back as far as 1200 BCE of the game being played in Tara, County Meath. Hurling is related to the games of shinty that is played primarily in Scotland, cammag on the Isle of Man and bando which was played formerly in England and Wales. The tale of the Táin Bó Cuailnge (drawing on earlier legends) describes the hero Cúchulainn playing hurling at Emain Macha. Similar tales are told about Fionn Mac Cumhail and the Fianna, his legendary warrior band. Recorded references to hurling appear in many places such as the fourteenth century Statutes of Kilkenny and a fifteenth-century grave slab survives in Inishowen, County Donegal.

The eighteenth century is frequently referred to as "The Golden Age of Hurling". This was when members of the Anglo-Irish landed gentry kept teams of players on their estates and challenged each other's teams to matches for the amusement of their tenants.

One of the first modern attempts to standardise the game with a formal, written set of rules came with the foundation of the Irish Hurling Union at Trinity College Dublin in 1879. It aimed "to draw up a code of rules for all clubs in the union and to foster that manly and noble game of hurling in this, its native country".

The founding of the Gaelic Athletic Association (GAA) in 1884 in Hayes Hotel, Thurles, Co Tipperary, ended decline by organising the game around a common set of written rules. In 1888, Tipperary  represented by Thurles Blues beat Meelick of Galway to win the first All-Ireland Championship. However, the twentieth century saw Cork, Kilkenny as well as Tipperary dominate hurling with each of these counties winning more than 20 All-Ireland titles each. Wexford, Waterford, Clare, Limerick, Offaly, Antrim, Dublin, and Galway were also strong hurling counties during the twentieth century.

As hurling entered the new millennium, it has remained Ireland's second most popular sport. An extended qualifier system resulted in a longer All-Ireland Senior Hurling Championship. Pay-for-play remains controversial and the Gaelic Players Association continues to grow in strength. The inauguration of the Christy Ring Cup and Nicky Rackard Cup gave new championships and an opportunity to play in Croke Park to the weaker county teams. Further dissemination of the championship structure was completed in 2009 with the addition of the Lory Meagher Cup to make it a four tier championship.

Hurling at the Olympic Games
Hurling was an unofficial sport at the 1904 Summer Olympics in St. Louis, Missouri, in the United States. In the final, Fenian F.C. (Chicago) USA beat Innisfails (St. Louis). This was the only time hurling was in the Olympics.

International

Although many hurling clubs exist worldwide, only Ireland has a national team (although it includes only players from weaker counties in order to ensure matches are competitive). It and the Scotland shinty team have played for many years with modified match rules (as with International Rules Football). The match is the only such international competition. However, competition at club level has been going on around the world since the late nineteenth century thanks to emigration from Ireland, and the strength of the game has ebbed and flowed along with emigration trends. Nowadays, growth in hurling is noted in Continental Europe, Australia, and North America.

Argentina
Irish immigrants began arriving in Argentina in the 19th century.

The earliest reference to hurling in Argentina dates from the late 1880s in Mercedes, Buenos Aires. However, the game was not actively promoted until 1900, when it came to the attention of author and newspaperman William Bulfin. Under Bulfin's patronage, the Argentine Hurling Club was formed on 15 July 1900, leading to teams being established in different neighborhoods of Buenos Aires and the surrounding farming communities.

Games of hurling were played every weekend until 1914 and received frequent coverage from Argentina's Spanish language newspapers, such as La Nación. After the outbreak of World War I, it became almost impossible to obtain hurleys from Ireland. An attempt was made to use native Argentine mountain ash, but it proved too heavy and lacking in pliability. Although the game was revived after the end of the war, the golden age of Argentine hurling had passed. World War II finally brought the era to its close.

In the aftermath of the Second World War, immigration from Ireland slowed to a trickle. In addition, native born Irish-Argentines assimilated into the local community. The last time that hurling was played in Argentina was in 1980, when the Aer Lingus Hurling Club conducted a three-week tour of the country and played matches at several locations. Since 2009, with the realization of several Summers Camps and the visit of the All Stars in December, hurling returned to be a frequent activity at the Hurling Club, where many boys and young men have since been trained and taught to play. Even the Hurling Club are invited to participate Hurling Festival is organized within The Gathering events organized by Aer Lingus. This team was present in September 2013 in the city of Galway. The team consists of 21 players from Hockey and Rugby teams. Many have contributed to the return of hurling as an activity in the club. As an example we can name Alejandro Yoyo Wade, Johnny Wade, Barbie, Cecilia and Irene Scally, David Ganly, Dickie Mac Allister, Eduardo Cabrera Punter, Hernan Magrini Scally. Several Irish have participated in many opportunities to work with the skills and education: Jonathan Lynch, Kevin O'Connors and Michael Connery, who currently works with the team's training to participate in the Aer Lingus International Hurling Festival.

Australia

The earliest reference to hurling in Australia is related in the book "Sketches of Garryowen." On 12 July 1844, a match took place at Batman's Hill in Melbourne as a counterpoint to a march by the Orange Order. Reportedly, the hurling match attracted a crowd of five hundred Irish immigrants, while the Orange march shivered out of existence.

Several hurling clubs existed in Victoria in the 1870s including Melbourne, Collingwood, Upper Yarra, Richmond and Geelong.

In 1885, a game between two Sydney based teams took place before a crowd of over ten thousand spectators. Reportedly, the contest was greatly enjoyed despite the fact that one newspaper dubbed the game "Two Degrees Safer Than War."

Arden Street Oval in North Melbourne was used by Irish immigrants during the 1920s.
The game in Australasia is administered by Australasia GAA.

Great Britain

Hurling was brought to Great Britain in the 19th century. The game is administered by British GAA. Warwickshire and Lancashire compete at inter-county level in the Lory Meagher Cup, competing against other counties in Ireland. London is the only non-Irish team to have won the All-Ireland Senior Hurling Championship (having captured the title in 1901), and after winning the 2012 Christy Ring Cup gained the right to contest the Liam MacCarthy Cup in 2013.

The first ever hurling game played in the Scottish Highlands was played at Easter 2012 between CLG Micheal Breathnach and Fir Uladh, an Ulster select of Gaeiligoiri, as part of the Iomain Cholmcille festival, na Breathnaich coming out victorious.

Wales has its own club, St. Colmilles in Cardiff.

South Africa
Soldiers who served in the Irish Brigade during the Anglo-Boer War are believed to have played the game on the veldt. Immigrants from County Wicklow who had arrived to work in the explosives factory in Umbogintwini, KwaZulu-Natal formed a team c. 1915–16. A major burst of immigration in the 1920s led to the foundation of the Transvaal Hurling Association in Johannesburg in 1928. Games were traditionally played in a pitch on the site of the modern day Johannesburg Central Railway Station every Easter Sunday after Mass.

In 1932, a South African hurling team sailed to Ireland to compete in the Tailteann Games, where they carried a banner donated by a convent of Irish nuns in Cape Town. On their arrival, they were personally received by the Taoiseach (Prime Minister) at the time, Éamon de Valera.

South African hurling continued to prosper until the outbreak of the Second World War, which caused immigration from Ireland to cease and made it impossible to import equipment. Games of hurling and Gaelic football were occasionally sponsored by the Christian Brothers schools in Boksburg and Pretoria well into the 1950s. Both games have all but ceased to be played.

North America

References to hurling on the North American continent date from the 1780s in modern-day Canada concerning immigrants from County Waterford and County Kilkenny, and also, in New York City. After the end of the American Revolution, references to hurling cease in American newspapers until the aftermath of the Great Famine when Irish people moved to America in huge numbers, bringing the game with them. Newspaper reports from the 1850s refer to occasional matches played in San Francisco, Hoboken and New York City. The first game of hurling played under GAA rules outside Ireland was played on Boston Common in June 1886.

In 1888, there was an American tour by fifty Gaelic athletes from Ireland, known as the 'American Invasion'. This created enough interest among Irish Americans to lay the groundwork for the North American GAA. By the end of 1889, almost a dozen GAA clubs existed in America, many of them in and around New York City, Philadelphia and Chicago. Later, clubs were formed in Boston, Cleveland, and many other centers of Irish America. Concord, New Hampshire has its state's only hurling team, New Hampshire Wolves, sponsored by Litherman's Limited Craft Brewery.

In 1910, twenty-two hurlers, composed of an equal number from Chicago and New York, conducted a tour of Ireland, where they played against the County teams from Kilkenny, Tipperary, Limerick, Dublin and Wexford.Traditionally, hurling was a game played by Irish immigrants and discarded by their children. Many American hurling teams took to raising money to import players directly from Ireland. In recent years, this has changed considerably with the advent of the Internet and increased travel. The Barley House Wolves hurling team from New Hampshire was formed when U.S. soldiers returning from Iraq saw a hurling game on the television in Shannon Airport as their plane refuelled. Outside of the traditional North American GAA cities of New York, Boston, Chicago and San Francisco, clubs are springing up in other places where they consist of predominantly American-born players who bring a new dimension to the game and actively seek to promote it as a mainstream sport, especially Joe Maher, a leading expert at the sport in Boston. Currently, the Milwaukee Hurling Club, with 300 members, is the largest Hurling club in the world outside Ireland, which is made of all Americans and very few Irish immigrants. The St. Louis Gaelic Athletic Club was established in 2002 and has expanded its organization to an eight team hurling league in the spring and six team Gaelic football league in the fall. They also have a 30-member camogie league. Saint Louis has won two National Championships in Jr C Hurling (2004 and 2011), as well as two National Championships in Jr D Gaelic Football (2005, and 2013). The Indianapolis Hurling Club began in 2002, then reformed in 2005. In 2008, the Indy Hurling Club won the Junior C National Championship. In 2011, Indy had 7 club teams and sent a Junior B, Junior C and Camogie team to nationals. Hurling continues to grow in popularity with teams now in Knoxville, TN, Charleston, SC, Orlando, FL, Tampa, FL, Augusta, GA, Greenville, SC, Indianapolis, IN, Worcester, MA, Corvallis, OR, Akron, OH, Raleigh, NC, Concord, NH, Portland, Maine, Providence, RI, Twin Cities, MN, Madison, WI, Milwaukee, WI, Washington, DC, Hampton Roads, VA, Rochester NY, Nashville, TN, Richmond, VA, Hartford, CT, Missoula, MT, Butte, MT and Seattle, WA.

The GAA have also begun to invest in American college students with university teams springing up at University of Connecticut, Stanford University, UC Berkeley, Purdue University, Indiana University, University of Montana and other schools. On 31 January 2009, the first ever US collegiate hurling match was held between UC Berkeley and Stanford University, organized by the newly formed California Collegiate Gaelic Athletic Association. UC Berkeley won the challenge match by one point, while Stanford won the next two CCGAA matches to win the first collegiate cup competition in the U.S. On Memorial Day Weekend of 2011, the first ever National Collegiate GAA championship was played. The Indiana University Hurling Club won all matches of the tournament, and won by four points in the championship final to be crowned the first ever U.S. National Collegiate Champions.

Major hurling competitions

 All-Ireland Senior Hurling Championship
 Connacht Senior Hurling Championship
 Leinster Senior Hurling Championship
 Munster Senior Hurling Championship
 Ulster Senior Hurling Championship
 National Hurling League
 Christy Ring Cup
 Nicky Rackard Cup
 All-Ireland Senior Club Hurling Championship
 Leinster Senior Club Hurling Championship
 All-Ireland Under-21 Hurling Championship
 Leinster Under-21 Hurling Championship
 All-Ireland Minor Hurling Championship
 Poc Fada
 Féile na nGael
 Composite rules shinty–hurling (usually internationals between Scotland and Ireland)

Popular culture

See also
 Camogie
 Field Hockey
 Bando (sport)
 Shinty
 Women's shinty
 Lacrosse

References

Further reading

External links

 Hurling at the GAA website

 
Gaelic games
Hurlers
Stick sports
Sports originating in Ireland
Team sports